The sixteenth edition of the Johan Cruyff Shield was held on 30 July 2011 at the Amsterdam Arena. The match was played between 2010–11 KNVB Cup winners FC Twente and 2010–11 Eredivisie winners Ajax. FC Twente won 2–1 in front of 45,000 spectators.

Match details

References

2011
Joh
j
j
Johan Cruyff Shield